Let's Go! is a 2011 Hong Kong action film directed by Wong Ching-po. It screened at the 2011 Hong Kong Asian Film Festival.

Plot
Siu Sheung (Juno Mak) is a solitary and frustrated young man. He works as a delivery boy at a small noodle shop and lives with his mother (Pat Ha) in a large, dilapidated Kowloon housing estate. As a young boy he enjoyed nothing more than watching his favourite anime, Space Emperor God Sigma, and singing along to Leslie Cheung's theme song with his father. However, after seeing his dad shot dead trying to apprehend a bank robber, Siu Sheung has spent the last twenty years wandering aimlessly, looking for a way to bring justice back to the community.

A local gangster, Shing (Gordon Lam), impressed by Siu Sheung's fighting skills, recruits him into his gang, part of the impressive Matsumoto syndicate, run by Boss Hon Yu (Jimmy Wang Yu). Desperate for the money, Siu Sheung takes the job and soon finds himself working as personal bodyguard to Hon Yu's beautiful yet feisty daughter, Annie (Stephy Tang). When Shing embarks on a violent coup to overthrow Hon Yu, Siu Sheung is forced into action, not only to protect Annie, but to defeat evil and restore peace and harmony to the community.

References

External links

Review at Love HK Film
Let's Go! at MY.AC

Hong Kong action films
2010s Cantonese-language films
2011 films
Films directed by Wong Ching-po
2010s Hong Kong films